The Government of Japan has been making various efforts on its security policy which include: the establishment of the National Security Council (NSC), the adoption of the National Security Strategy (NSS), and the National Defense Program Guidelines (NDPG).

These efforts are made based on the belief that Japan, as a "Proactive Contributor to Peace", needs to contribute more actively to the peace and stability of the region and the international community, while coordinating with other countries including its ally, the United States.

On December 4, 2013, the National Security Council was established, with the aim of establishing a forum which will undertake strategic discussions under the Prime Minister on a regular basis and as necessary on various national security issues and exercising a strong political leadership.

National Security Strategy (NSS) 

On December 17. 2013, National Security Strategy was adopted by Cabinet decision. NSS sets the basic orientation of diplomatic and defense policies related to national security. NSS presents the content of the policy of "Proactive Contribution to Peace" in a concrete manner and promotes better understanding of Japan's national security policy.
By March 2024 the peacetime use of civilian airports and ports by the Self-Defense Forces and its security partners is expected to be revised to improve military readiness in view of the Russian attack on Ukraine and contingencies on Taiwan.

Budget
In 1976, then Prime Minister Miki Takeo announced defense spending should be maintained within 1% of Japan's gross domestic product (GDP), a ceiling that was observed until 1986. As of 2005, Japan's military budget was maintained at about 3% of the national budget; about half is spent on personnel costs, while the rest is for weapons programs, maintenance and operating costs. As of 2015, Japan currently has the sixth largest defense budget in the world.

References

  - Japan

See also
 Article 9 of the Japanese Constitution
 Ministry of Defense (Japan)
 2015 Japanese military legislation